Peg Larsen (born August 10, 1949) is an American politician in the state of Minnesota. She served in the Minnesota House of Representatives.

References

Republican Party members of the Minnesota House of Representatives
Women state legislators in Minnesota
1949 births
Living people
Politicians from Pittsburgh
People from Washington County, Minnesota
Slippery Rock University of Pennsylvania